The 1947 Raisin Bowl was a college football postseason bowl game that featured the Utah State Aggies and the San Jose State Spartans.

Background
The Aggies (their school was then known as Utah Agricultural) were co-champions of the Mountain States Conference with Denver, though they would be the one invited to play San Jose State in the Raisin Bowl in Fresno. The Spartans were an independent team, though they had eight victories under first year head coach Wilbur V. Hubbard. This was the first bowl game for either team.

Game summary
San Jose State - Jackson 10 yd pass from Schemmel
San Jose State - Jackson 11 yd pass from Schemmel
San Jose State - Rhyne 2 yd run

Substitute halfback Bill Schembel threw a pass to quarterback Bill Jackson for a touchdown to open the scoring for the Spartans. Jackson returned the favor in the second half with a touchdown pass to Schembel. Bill Rhyne scored on a one-yard touchdown run to make it 20-0. The Aggies had the ball at the Spartan one in the first and fourth quarter, but they did not score, a consequence of having only 126 yards the entire game.

Aftermath
The Aggies did not reach a bowl game again until 1960. The Spartans returned to the Raisin Bowl two years later.

Statistics

References

Raisin Bowl
Raisin Bowl
San Jose State Spartans football bowl games
Utah State Aggies football bowl games
January 1947 sports events in the United States
Raisin Bowl